The 2014–15 Texas Longhorns women's basketball team will represent the University of Texas at Austin in the 2014–15 college basketball season. It will be head coach Karen Aston's third season at Texas. The Longhorns were members of the Big 12 Conference and will play their home games at the Frank Erwin Center. They finished the season 24–11, 9–9 in Big 12 play for a four-way tie to finish in third place. They advanced to the championship game of the Big 12 women's basketball tournament where they lost to Baylor. They received at-large bid of the NCAA women's basketball tournament where they defeated Western Kentucky in the first round, California in the second round before losing to Connecticut in the sweet sixteen.

Rankings

2014–15 media

Television & Radio information
Most University of Texas home games will be shown on the Longhorn Network, and select games will be available through FSN affiliates. Women's basketball games will also be carried on the radio via KVET.

Roster

Schedule

|-
!colspan=12 style="background:#CC5500; color:#FFFFFF;"| Exhibition

|-
!colspan=12 style="background:#CC5500; color:#FFFFFF;"| Non-conference regular season

|-
!colspan=12 style="background:#CC5500; color:#FFFFFF;"| Big 12 Regular Season

|-
!colspan=12 style="background:#CC5500; color:#FFFFFF;"| 2015 Big 12 women's basketball tournament

|-
!colspan=12 style="background:#CC5500; color:#FFFFFF;"| NCAA women's tournament

See also
Texas Longhorns women's basketball
2014–15 Texas Longhorns men's basketball team

References

Texas
Texas Longhorns women's basketball seasons
Texas
Texas Longhorns
Texas Longhorns